The Gauliga Hessen was the highest football league in the German state of Hesse and the Prussian province of Hesse-Nassau from 1933 to 1945. From 1941, it was renamed Gauliga Kurhessen. Shortly after the formation of the league, the Nazis reorganised the administrative regions in Germany, and the Gau Electoral Hesse replaced the Prussian province and the Peoples State.

Overview
The league was introduced by the Nazi Sports Office in 1933, after the Nazi take over of power in Germany and Baden. It replaced the Bezirksliga as the highest level of play in German football competitions.

The Gauliga Hessen was established with ten clubs, all from the region of Hesse.

The Gauliga replaced as such the Bezirksliga Main-Hessen and Bezirksliga Hessen-Hannover, the highest leagues in the region until then. As such, it mixed clubs which had previously belonged to different Football Associations, the Southern German FA (Main/Hessen) and the West German FA (Hessen/Hannover).

The region it covered was never particularly successful in German football and this didn't change with the establishment of the Gauliga. No club from this league reached any German cup or championship final in this period.

In its first season, the league had ten clubs, playing each other once at home and once away. The league winner qualified for the German championship while the bottom two teams were relegated. The league remained unchanged until the outbreak of World War II.

In 1939-40 and 1940–41, the league played in two separate groups of six teams with a home-and-away final at the end to determine the leagues champion.

In 1941, the league returned to a single-division format and renamed Gauliga Kurhessen, but with only nine clubs. Also, some of the clubs from the south, like FC Hanau 93, left the league for the new Gauliga Hessen-Nassau. The 1942–43 season was played in the same modus.

The worsening war situation and lack of players forced many clubs to merge and form KSG's, Kriegsspielgemeinschaften (combined wartime side) and therefore the league only had seven clubs in 1943–44.

For the Gauligas final season, it was split in three regional divisions with a varying number of clubs.

The imminent collapse of Nazi Germany in 1945 gravely affected all Gauligas and football in Hessen ceased in early 1945 with none of the groups having absolved their full program.

With the end of the Nazi era, the Gauligas ceased to exist. In the US occupation zone, which the newly created federal state of Hessen was part of, the Oberliga Süd was formed in late 1945, to replace this league.

Founding members of the league
The ten founding members and their positions in the 1932-33 Bezirksliga Main/Hessen and Bezirksliga Hessen/Hannover season were:
 Borussia Fulda, winner Hessen division
 VfB Friedberg, 10th Main division
 FC Hanau 93, 9th Main division
 Kurhessen Kassel, Hessen division
 CSC 03 Kassel, Hessen division
 SG Hessen Hersfeld, Hessen division
 SV 06 Kassel, Hessen division
 BC Sport Kassel, Hessen division
 VfB Marburg, Hessen division
 Hermannia Kassel, Hessen division

Winners and runners-up of the Gauliga Hessen
The winners and runners-up of the league:

Placings in the Gauliga Hessen and Kurhessen 1933-44
The complete list of all clubs participating in the league:

 1 These four clubs joined the new Gauliga Hessen-Nassau in 1941.
 2 In 1943, a number of clubs from Kassel formed “war sport unions” (German: KSG), those being:
 Kurhessen and SC 03 formed KSG Kurhessen/SC 03 Kassel.
 TuRa and TuSpo formed KSG TuRa/TuSpo 86/09 Kassel.
 BC Sport and BV 06 formed KSG BC Sport/BV 06 Kassel.
 3 Played in 1943-44 as Reichsbahn SG Borussia Fulda.

References

Sources
 Die deutschen Gauligen 1933-45 - Heft 1-3  Tables of the Gauligas 1933–45, publisher: DSFS
 Kicker Almanach,  The yearbook on German football from Bundesliga to Oberliga, since 1937, published by the Kicker Sports Magazine
 Süddeutschlands Fussballgeschichte in Tabellenform 1897-1988  History of Southern German football in tables, publisher & author: Ludolf Hyll

External links
  The Gauligas Das Deutsche Fussball Archiv
 Germany - Championships 1902-1945 at RSSSF.com

Sports leagues established in 1933
1933 establishments in Germany
1945 disestablishments in Germany
Gauliga
Football competitions in Hesse